Geoffrey Elson (19 March 1913 – 30 December 1999) was an English cricketer.  Elson was a left-handed batsman who bowled slow left-arm orthodox.  He was born at Coventry, Warwickshire and educated at Rydal Penrhos.  He was more commonly known by his nickname Gus.

Elson made a first-class appearance for Warwickshire against Essex in the 1947 County Championship at Courtaulds Ground, Coventry.  Elson ended Warwickshire's first-innings unbeaten on 3, with Warwickshire making a total of 320 all out.  In Essex's first-innings, he took the wicket of Frank Vigar, finishing with figures of 1/99 from 44 overs as Essex compiled 493.  Warwickshire made 292 in their second-innings, with Elson scoring 4 runs before being dismissed by Peter Smith.  He bowled eight wicketless overs in Essex's second-innings, with Essex securing a 6 wicket victory.

He died at Rugby, Warwickshire on 30 December 1999.  He was the father of professional golfer Pip Elson.

References

External links

1913 births
1999 deaths
Cricketers from Coventry
People educated at Rydal Penrhos
English cricketers
Warwickshire cricketers